Rhianon Passmore is a Welsh Labour and Co-operative politician. Since May 2016, she has been the Member of the Senedd for Islwyn.

Political career
In July 2015, it was announced that Passmore had been selected as the Welsh Labour candidate for the Islwyn constituency of the Senedd. On 5 May 2016, she was elected a Member of the Welsh Assembly with 10,050 votes (45.0% of votes cast).

Passmore had previously stood as a regional candidate for Mid and West Wales in the 2003 Welsh elections and a regional candidate for South Wales East in the 2007 elections.

Arrest and controversy
In October 2017 she was arrested by South Wales Police after failing to provide a breath test; as a result she was banned from driving for 20 months, fined £1,000, £100 victim surcharge and £620 in costs. She was also suspended from the National Assembly for a fortnight and was suspended by the Labour Group from 10 July 2018 until 1 October 2018.

References

Year of birth missing (living people)
Place of birth missing (living people)
Living people
Welsh Labour members of the Senedd
Female members of the Senedd
Wales MSs 2016–2021
Wales MSs 2021–2026
Labour Co-operative members of the Senedd